Directorate General of Food is a government department responsible for food management and policy in Bangladesh and is located in Dhaka, Bangladesh. It is responsible for the import of foods under Bangladesh government contracts.

History
Directorate General of Food traces its origins to the Food Department created in 1943 after the 1943 Bengal Famine. In 1955 the government of East Pakistan tried to abolish the department and place its responsibilities under the Department of Agriculture. Its functions were stopped for 7 months but the merger failed to proceed. After the Independence of Bangladesh the Directorate General of Food under the Ministry of Food & Civil supplies. In 2012 the Food department was placed under the Ministry of Food.

References

1943 establishments in India
Organisations based in Dhaka
Government departments of Bangladesh